Charlotte Dacre  (1771 or 1772 – 7 November 1825), born Charlotte King, was an English author of Gothic novels. Most references today are given as Charlotte Dacre, but she first wrote under the pseudonym "Rosa Matilda" and later adopted a second pseudonym to confuse her critics. She became Charlotte Byrne on her marriage to Nicholas Byrne in 1815.

Life
Dacre was one of three legitimate children of John King, born Jacob Rey (c. 1753–1824), a Jewish moneylender of Portuguese Sephardic origin, who was also a blackmailer and a radical political writer well known in London society. Her father divorced her mother, Sarah King (née Lara), under Jewish law in 1784, before setting up home with the dowager Countess of Lanesborough. Dacre had a sister named Sophia, also a writer, and a brother named Charles.

Charlotte Dacre married Nicholas Byrne, a widower, on 1 July 1815. She already had three children with him: William Pitt Byrne (born 1806), Charles (born 1807) and Mary (born 1809). He was an editor and future partner of London's The Morning Post newspaper where the author Mary Robinson was the poetry editor and an influence on a young Charlotte Dacre, who began her writing career by contributing poems to the Morning Post under the pseudonym "Rosa Matilda."

Work
As a romance novelist, Dacre cast heroines in a way quite different from the norm of the early 19th century, which called for ladies of decorum and good taste. Her style was more like that of the male authors of her era, creating aggressive and often physically violent female characters who demonstrate powerful sexual desires and ambition. Dacre usually constructed this behaviour in a way that can be at least in part justified by the actions of others.

Of her four major novels, Zofloya is the best known today and sold well on its release in 1806. It was translated into German and into French. The story has a female character who stalks, brutally attacks and then murders a girl whom she sees as a sexual rival. Yet, despite the brutality, the story relates an underlying moral message that young women should beware of the dangers of lust.

Influence
In the literary world, Charlotte Dacre has remained in virtual obscurity for nearly two centuries. Yet her work was admired by some of the literary giants of her day and her novels influenced Percy Bysshe Shelley, who thought highly of her style and creative skills. She is believed to be one of the numerous targets of Lord Byron's satirical poem English Bards and Scotch Reviewers, mentioned in the lines:
Far be't from me unkindly to upbraid
The lovely 's prose in masquerade,
Whose strains, the faithful echoes of her mind,
Leave wondering comprehension far behind.

Partial bibliography
Trifles of Helicon, with her sister Sophia King
Hours of Solitude (Poems) (1805)
Confessions of the Nun of St. Omer (1805)
Zofloya  (1806)
The Libertine (1807)
The Passions (1811)
George the Fourth, a Poem (1822)

References

External links
Charlotte Dacre, from Wikinfo, licensed under the GNU Free Documentation License.
Works by Charlotte Dacre at Gutenberg.org.
Works by Charlotte Dacre at HathiTrust.
Works by Charlotte Dacre at Internet Archive.
Works by Charlotte Dacre at Google Books

Corvey CW3 - Author Page - Charlotte Dacre at Sheffield Hallam University (based on Corvey collection) 

1771 births
1825 deaths
Writers from London
English romantic fiction writers
Jewish poets
Jewish women writers
English Jewish writers
English women poets
English women novelists
19th-century English novelists
Women romantic fiction writers
19th-century English women writers
19th-century English writers
19th-century British writers
Pseudonymous women writers
Writers of Gothic fiction
Women of the Regency era
19th-century pseudonymous writers